The Province of Temeşvar, known as Province of Yanova after 1658, was a first-level administrative unit (eyalet) of the Ottoman Empire located in the Banat region of Central Europe.

Besides Banat, the province also included area north of the Mureș River, part of the Crișana region. Its territory is now divided between Hungary, Romania, and Serbia. Its capital was Temeşvar (today's Timișoara).

Names
The name of the province in Ottoman Turkish was Eyâlet-i Temeşvar or Eyâlet-i Tımışvar (in Modern Turkish: Temeşvar Eyaleti or Tamışvar Eyaleti), in Hungarian was Temesvári vilajet, in Romanian was Eialetul Timișoarei or Pașalâcul Timișoara, in Serbian was Темишварски ејалет or Temišvarski ejalet. The province was named after its administrative seat, Temeşvar. The Turkish name Temeşvar is given after the Hungarian one, Temesvár meaning "Castle on the Temes" (River).

History

The Eyalet of Temeşvar was formed in 1552, when the Hungarian castle of Temesvár defended by the troop of István Losonczy was captured by the Ottoman troops led by Kara Ahmed Pasha on July 26, 1552 and existed until 1716, when it was conquered by the Habsburg monarchy. In 1718, the Habsburgs formed a new province in this region, named the Banat of Temeswar.

Administrative divisions

Governors

 Kazim-bey or Gazi Kasim-pasha (1552–1554)
 Hasan-pasha (1594)
 Sofi Sinan-pasha (1594)
 Hasan-pasha, the younger (1594)
 Mustafa Pasha ( July 1594)
 Dželalija Hasan-paša (1604–1605)
 Ahmed-paša Dugalić (1605–)
 Ibrahim-pasha (1687)
 Ibrahim-pasha (1701-)

See also
 Banat
 Banat of Temeswar

References

Further reading
Dr. Dušan J. Popović, Srbi u Vojvodini, knjiga 1, Novi Sad, 1990.
Milan Tutorov, Banatska rapsodija, Novi Sad, 2001.

External links
 Province of Temeşvar in 1600 – Map
 Province of Temeşvar in 1700 – Map
 Province of Temeşvar – Map
 Province of Temeşvar – Map
 Province of Temeşvar – Map

 
Eyalets of the Ottoman Empire in Europe
Ottoman period in Romania
Ottoman Serbia
Ottoman period in Hungary
Ottoman history of Vojvodina
History of Banat
States and territories established in 1552
1552 establishments in the Ottoman Empire
1716 disestablishments in the Ottoman Empire